The Ven. Elwyn Bernard Thomas B.Sc., BD, was an Archdeacon of St Asaph in the Church in Wales Diocese of St Asaph.

He was born in 1945, educated at Swansea University and St Michael's College, Llandaff, and ordained in 1972. After curacies at Aberdare and Merthyr Dyfan, he held incumbencies in  Dowlais,  Llangynwyd with Maesteg. From 2000 until his August 2011 retirement, he was Rector of Llandyrnog and Archdeacon of the surrounding area (St Asaph) and a trustee of the St Asaph Diocesan Board of Finance

Notes

1945 births
Alumni of Swansea University
Alumni of St Michael's College, Llandaff
20th-century Welsh Anglican priests
21st-century Welsh Anglican priests
Archdeacons of St Asaph
Living people